Chionodes imber is a moth in the family Gelechiidae (twirler moths). C. imber is found in North America, where it has been recorded from southern Ontario and Massachusetts to Arizona, Texas, Florida and Idaho.  C. Imber was discovered by Hodges, 1999 and the larvae of C. Imber feed on Myrica aspleniifolia.

References

Chionodes
Moths described in 1999
Moths of North America